Shaftesbury Avenue is a major road in the West End of London, named after The 7th Earl of Shaftesbury. It runs north-easterly from Piccadilly Circus to New Oxford Street, crossing Charing Cross Road at Cambridge Circus. From Piccadilly Circus to Cambridge Circus, it is in the City of Westminster, and from Cambridge Circus to New Oxford Street, it is in the London Borough of Camden.

Shaftesbury Avenue was built between 1877 and 1886 by the architect George Vulliamy and the engineer Sir Joseph Bazalgette, to provide a north–south traffic artery through the crowded districts of St. Giles and Soho. It was also part of a slum clearance measure, to push impoverished workers out of the city centre. Although the street's construction was stalled by legislation requiring rehousing some of these displaced residents, overcrowding persisted.  Charles Booth's Poverty Map shows the neighbourhood makeup shortly after Shaftesbury Avenue opened.

The avenue is generally considered the heart of London's West End theatre district, with the Lyric, Apollo, Gielgud and Sondheim theatres clustered together on the west side of the road between Piccadilly Circus and Charing Cross Road. At the intersection of Shaftesbury Avenue and Charing Cross Road there is also the large Palace Theatre. Finally, the north-eastern end of the road has another large theatre, the Shaftesbury Theatre.

Also on Shaftesbury Avenue is the former Saville Theatre, which became a cinema in 1970. It was first known as ABC1 and ABC2 but, since 2001, it has been the Odeon Covent Garden. Another cinema, the Soho Curzon, is located about halfway along the street.

Between 1899 and 1902, no. 67 Shaftesbury Avenue was the location of the Bartitsu School of Arms and Physical Culture, which is the first commercial Asian martial arts training school in the Western world.

Shaftesbury Avenue marks the boundary of three discrete West End areas. The subsection of the road from Piccadily Circus to Cambridge Circus marks the southern border of Soho. Of that subsection a slightly shorter stretch thereof, from Great Windmill Street to Cambridge Circus, denotes the southern edge of the Soho gay village. Overlapping the gay village boundary, the still-shorter part of the street from Wardour Street to Greek Street marks the interface between gay Soho and London's Chinatown. 

The number of Chinese businesses on the street has been on the increase. On the ground level in Aug 2007, there were two traditional Chinese medicine practices, five Chinese restaurants, three Chinese supermarkets, three Chinese travel agents, two Chinese mobile phone outlets, a Chinese cake shop, two Chinese hair salons, a  Chinese fishmonger, a Chinese newsagent, a Chinese bureau de change, and three Chinese banks.

In the evening, street artists gather on the pavement outside the HQ of ICE - International Currency Exchange and Raphaels Bank (previously the home of NatWest) at the Piccadilly Circus end of Shaftesbury Avenue, and produce portraits for the tourists.

On 27 January 2023, a maintenance worker was killed after he was crushed by a telescopic urinal on the street.

See also
 List of London theatres
 Chinatown, London
 List of eponymous roads in London

Notes

External links

 Shaftesbury Avenue London W1 — TourUK information
 Shaftesbury Avenue shown on a Poverty Map — Charles Booth's London
 Survey of London — detailed architectural history
 Lyric Theatre
 Apollo Theatre
 Gielgud Theatre
 Sondheim Theatre
 Palace Theatre
 Shaftesbury Theatre

West End theatre
Roads designated in 1886
Streets in the London Borough of Camden
Streets in the City of Westminster
Entertainment districts in the United Kingdom